Leandro Sosa Toranza (born 24 June 1994) is a Uruguayan footballer who plays as a midfielder for Ayacucho FC.

Career

Club
Sosa began his career in Uruguay with Uruguayan Segunda División club Atenas in 2012. He made 83 league appearances and scored 11 goals in four seasons for the club before being loaned out to Chilean Primera División side O'Higgins in 2016. He made his O'Higgins debut on 31 January in a goalless draw against Deportes Iquique. He returned to Atenas at the end of his loan spell, he scored 2 goals in 21 appearances in total for O'Higgins. In February 2017, Sosa joined Uruguayan Primera División side Racing.

Career statistics

Club
.

References

External links
 
 
 

1994 births
Living people
People from Punta del Este
Uruguayan footballers
Uruguayan expatriate footballers
Association football midfielders
Atenas de San Carlos players
O'Higgins F.C. footballers
Racing Club de Montevideo players
Atlético Venezuela C.F. players
C.D. Olimpia players
C.A. Progreso players
Ayacucho FC footballers
Uruguayan Segunda División players
Uruguayan Primera División players
Chilean Primera División players
Venezuelan Primera División players
Liga Nacional de Fútbol Profesional de Honduras players
Uruguayan expatriate sportspeople in Chile
Uruguayan expatriate sportspeople in Venezuela
Uruguayan expatriate sportspeople in Honduras
Uruguayan expatriate sportspeople in Peru
Expatriate footballers in Chile
Expatriate footballers in Venezuela
Expatriate footballers in Honduras
Expatriate footballers in Peru